Ray Charles is the first studio album by American pianist, vocalist, and band leader Ray Charles. Originally released in June 1957 on Atlantic Records, it was re-released under the title Hallelujah I Love Her So in 1962. 

Although routinely identified as a debut album, Ray Charles could more accurately be identified as a greatest hits compilation, as all tracks had been previously issued and no fewer than 11 of its 14 tracks had been top 10 hits on the R&B chart between 1953 and 1957.  In order, they were: "Mess Around" (#3, 1953), "Don't You Know" (#10, 1954), "I Got a Woman" (#1, 1955),  "Come Back" (#4, 1955), "This Little Girl of Mine" (#9, 1955), "A Fool for You" (#1, 1955), "Greenbacks" (#5, 1955),  "Drown in My Own Tears" (#1, 1956), "Mary Ann" (#1, 1956), "Hallelujah I Love Her So" (#5, 1956) and "Ain't That Love" (#9, early 1957).

The three remaining tracks ("Funny (But I Still Love You)", "Sinner's Prayer" and "Losing Hand") were non-charting B-sides originally issued in 1953-54.  No tracks were recorded specifically for an album release.

Critical reception
The Rolling Stone Album Guide thought that "lesser tunes like 'Funny but I Still Love You' and 'Losing Hand' are just as interesting" as the hits.

Track listing

Personnel
 Ray Charles – vocals, piano
 The Ray Charles Orchestra – instrumentation
 Jerry Wexler – producer
 Marvin Israel – cover

References

 Atlantic Records 8006

1957 debut albums
Ray Charles albums
Albums produced by Jerry Wexler
Albums produced by Ahmet Ertegun
Atlantic Records albums